Verkhnyaya Pokrovka is a rural locality (a selo) and the administrative center of Verkhnepokrovskoye Rural Settlement, Krasnogvardeysky District, Belgorod Oblast, Russia. The population was 575 as of 2010. There are 3 streets.

Geography 
Verkhnyaya Pokrovka is located 25 km north of Biryuch (the district's administrative centre) by road. Chermenevka is the nearest rural locality.

References 

Rural localities in Krasnogvardeysky District, Belgorod Oblast